César André Lima Fonte (born 10 December 1986) is a Portuguese cyclist, who currently rides for UCI Continental team .

Major results

2012
 1st Stage 3 Volta a Portugal
2014
 5th Overall Troféu Joaquim Agostinho
2015
 1st  Mountains classification GP Liberty Seguros
 2nd Clássica Loulé
 5th Klasika Primavera
2016
 8th Overall Volta ao Alentejo
2018
 2nd Overall Volta Internacional Cova da Beira
1st Stage 2
 5th Road race, National Road Championships
 6th Overall Vuelta a la Comunidad de Madrid
 8th Overall GP Nacional 2 de Portugal
 10th Overall Vuelta a Asturias

References

External links

1986 births
Living people
Portuguese male cyclists
People from Viana do Castelo